Bellarmine Preparatory School is a private, Roman Catholic, coeducational high school run by the USA West Province of the Society of Jesus in Tacoma, Washington, United States. It is located in the Archdiocese of Seattle. Today it serves just over 900 students from the Greater Tacoma area, including Olympia, Gig Harbor, Federal Way, and Puyallup. It was founded in 1928 by the Jesuits.

History 
Bellarmine was founded in 1928 as an all-boys school and became the second coeducational Jesuit school in the nation in 1974 after its merger with the schools Aquinas and St. Leo's. The date of the school's creation is commonly accepted to be 1928. However, Saint Leo's Grammar and High School and Aquinas Academy for girls were founded earlier (1912 and 1893, respectively). Philomathea, the parents club, predates Bellarmine as it was founded at St. Leo's before moving to the school during the merger. The first graduating class of Bellarmine was in 1929, with 19 students graduating.

Campus 
The school sits on a large campus of 42 acres, at the highest point overlooking the city of Tacoma.  Poplar trees were planted as a memorial to Bellarmine Alumni in World War II near Memorial Field. Memorial Field remained a grass field up until 2017,  when it was replaced by a new turf field over the summer before the 2017-2018 school year. The school quad has the qualities of a Grad at Grad printed in metal letters on the concrete and the letters AMDG printed at the quad's center-most point.

Student life

Co-curricular activities

FIRST Robotics 
The school competes in the FIRST Robotics Competition (FRC) as Team 360, The Revolution. Established in 1999, the team has been recognized for the quality of the robots produced and for their commitment to community service. They are the oldest sustaining team in the Pacific Northwest District at 19 years. They have won multiple awards:

 2016 FIRST Championship Woodie Flowers (Eric Stokely) 
 2016 PNW District Championships Winner
 2015 Auburn District Competition Winner
 2012 Autodesk Oregon Regional Winner
 2011 Autodesk Oregon Regional Winner
 2011 Microsoft Seattle Cascade Regional Chairman's Award
 2009 Microsoft Seattle Regional Chairman's Award

Model UN 
In 2013, Bellarmine's Model UN program BellarMUN was created. It attends several conference conferences every year, including PACMUN, CAIMUN, AmeriMUNC and VMUN. BellarMUN also hosts its own middle school conference, BELLARMUN.

Athletics 

Over 70% of the student population competes in at least one athletic activity. It has been named All-Sports Champions by the Washington Interscholastic Activities Association the past four years, winning it for the first time in school history in 2004 with the second highest All-Sports score recorded in state history, and the highest score for a 2A, 3A, or 4A school. In 2004, the men's soccer team won its first state title with an undefeated record of 20-0-2. In 2008, the men's soccer team won its second state title.

Boys' sports offered: Cross country, Basketball, Wrestling, Tennis, Golf, Track and Field, Baseball, Soccer, Lacrosse, Sailing, and Football.

Girls' sports offered: Volleyball, Cross country, Basketball, Fast pitch, Track and field, Lacrosse, Sailing, Soccer, Tennis, and Golf.

Theater 
Bellarmine has a theater program which puts on two shows a year: a fall musical and a spring play, as well as a Dramafest featuring student-written one-act plays.

Community service 
As part of the required curriculum, Juniors must complete a total of thirty hours of community service, as well as helping out at the local L'Arche farm with their Ignatian Formation (homeroom) class during their Freshman year. Several community service clubs are active on campus such as Habitat for Humanity and Key Club, and Bellarmine offers several programs that serve the community, including Nativity House and Operation Keep ‘Em Warm and Fed.

In 1993, Bellarmine started Phoenix Housing, a tradition of housing temporarily homeless families in academic buildings during non-school hours for a small span of the year. Bellarmine provides these people dinner, breakfast, and overnight accommodations through the help of student volunteers.

Religion 
Religion is an integral part of the Bellarmine curriculum, with 3.5 credits of religion classes required for graduation.

Retreats 
Bellarmine holds a required student body retreat for the freshmen, called "On a Purpose for a Purpose". Freshmen and sophomores are also required to attend Faith in Formation meetings. These generally occur during CP (Community Period), now named Ignatian Formation (homeroom). The sophomore meetings focus more on volunteer work, including participation in a Habitat for Humanity build or work with L'Arche.

An optional overnight retreat, the Francis Xavier Urban Plunge, is offered in the fall and spring for sophomores. The retreat focuses on "street life" in the Tacoma Area.

Four retreats are offered to seniors. Senior Pilgrimage is a weekend hike up a mountain. Montserrat is an Ignatian, directed retreat which is made in complete silence for a 24-hour period, and the Manresa is also a silent retreat over a 48-hour period. The Magis is a three-day overnight retreat.

Bellarmine students may also work on crew or team for the Senior Pilgrimage, Magis retreat, and Junior Encounter.

Mass 
All-school Masses are rare, normally on Ash Wednesday, the last day before Christmas break, and the Feast of Saint Robert Bellarmine. The entire school attends, but active participation is optional. There are also occasional House Masses and prayer services, and Mass is offered on Tuesdays, Wednesdays, and Fridays prior to the start of school.

Academics 
Bellarmine offers 37 Advanced Placement, Honors or Dual Credit courses. 

At BPS, a total of 21 credits are specified as department requirements. A total of 26 credits will be required for graduation and a College Preparatory Diploma. The four-year semester program provides opportunities for students to earn 28.5 credits.

Art 
Bellarmine is home to an art program which offers activities such as Design, Crafts, Ceramics, Photography, Sculpture, Drawing, Painting, Printmaking and Theater. A senior is required to fulfill 1 Fine Arts credit by graduation— .5 credit in Visual Arts is required in addition to .5 credit in Visual Arts, Music or Stagecraft.

Marine Chemistry

The marine chemistry program is available to students who score sufficiently well on the school entrance examination and opt into doing extra research work to fulfill this requirement. It is a four-year program where students learn the skills needed to do chemical and biological marine research in their first two years, and then apply those skills in their own research projects during their junior and senior years.

Notable alumni
Avery Bradley, NBA free agent guard, most recently for the Los Angeles Lakers
Casey Calvary, former professional basketball player, Class of 1997
Malachi Flynn, NBA guard for the Toronto Raptors, Class of 2016
 Abdul Gaddy (born 1992), basketball player in the Israeli Basketball Premier League
Patrick Galbraith, former professional tennis player, Class of 1985
Molly Hightower
Jon Lester, former Major League Baseball pitcher, Class of 2002
Larry Loughlin, MLB pitcher (Philadelphia Phillies), Class of 1959
Ron Medved, NFL defensive back (Philadelphia Eagles), Class of 1962
Louis Renner, S.J., Jesuit, academic and historian of Catholic history in Alaska
Kyle Stanley, professional golfer, Class of 2006
Abdul Gaddy, pro basketball player, Class of 2009
Michael Rector, Detroit Lions (& Stanford University) wide receiver, Class of 2012
Sefo Liufau, University of Colorado quarterback, Class of 2013

References

Jesuit high schools in the United States
Catholic secondary schools in Washington (state)
Schools in Tacoma, Washington
Educational institutions established in 1928
High schools in Pierce County, Washington
Schools accredited by the Northwest Accreditation Commission
High schools within the Archdiocese of Seattle
1928 establishments in Washington (state)